The election for Resident Commissioner to the United States House of Representatives took place on November 8, 1960 the same day as the larger Puerto Rican general election and the United States elections, 1960.

Candidates for Resident Commissioner
 Jorge Luis Córdova for the Christian Action Party of Puerto Rico
 Antonio Fernós-Isern for the Popular Democratic Party
 Gabriel de la Haba for the Republican Party
 Roma Marti for the Puerto Rican Independence Party

Election results

See also 
Puerto Rican general election, 1960

References 

Puerto Rico
1960